The following is a list of the 84 municipalities (comuni) of the Province of Campobasso, Molise, Italy.

List

See also
List of municipalities of Italy

References

Campobasso